Karolówka may refer to the following places:
Karolówka, Lublin Voivodeship (east Poland)
Karolówka, Opole Voivodeship (south-west Poland)
Karolówka, Subcarpathian Voivodeship (south-east Poland)